Wallace Arnold (Barr & Wallace Arnold Trust) was one of the UK's largest holiday motorcoach tour operators.

History
Wallace Arnold was founded in 1912 and was named after two of its founders Wallace Cunningham and Arnold Crowe. In 1926, the Barr & Wallace Arnold Trust was founded by Robert Barr.

In February 1969, the Evan Evans tour business in London was purchased. In the late 1970s, Wallace Arnold commenced operating services under the Euroways banner to Europe.

By 1980 it operated 290 coaches from its headquarters in Gelderd Road, Wortley, Leeds, and owned a subsidiary based in Devon.

When coach services were deregulated by the Transport Act 1980 in October 1980, Wallace Arnold was a founding member of the British Coachways consortium that competed with the state-owned National Express. It left after a year and briefly ran its own service from London to Torbay.

In April 1994, the company gained media attention when five of its fleet transported all of the audience members of an episode of Don't Forget Your Toothbrush to Disneyland Paris, after the two selected audience members won the "Light Your Lemon" game.

In April 2005, Wallace Arnold merged with Shearings to become WA Shearings. In 2007 the Wallace Arnold name was dropped and now the company is known as Shearings Holidays. The merger included eight travel shops in Yorkshire, rebranded from Wallace Arnold Travel to WA Shearings. These kept the WA Shearings name until 2010, when they reverted to their original Wallace Arnold Travel name.

Wallace Arnold owned 2 stage carriage bus services, Kippax Motors and Farsley Omnibus. These were sold to Leeds Corporation in 1968.

Vehicles
Wallace Arnold was the largest operator of the Bedford VAL 3 axle coach. After becoming a large Leyland Leopard and Volvo B58 customer, in later years it standardised on Volvo B10M and Volvo B12Ms, mostly with Jonckheere and Plaxton bodies.

References

Further reading
Wallace Arnold Days Roger Davis Ian Allan 2010

External links

Flickr gallery

Defunct companies based in Leeds
Former coach operators in England
3i Group companies
1912 establishments in England
2005 disestablishments in England
British companies established in 1912
British companies disestablished in 2005